The Residence of Prince Miloš is a royal residence in the Topčider municipality of Belgrade, Serbia. It was originally used as the palace of Prince Miloš Obrenović. It was built in 1831, after Serbia was given autonomous status in the Ottoman Empire. The grounds include a plane tree over 160 years old, one of the oldest in Europe.

History
The palace was designed by architects Janja Mihailović and Nikola Đorđević and the construction was supervised by Hadži Nikola Živković, the primary builder in service of Prince Miloš. Some of their rich interior decoration of the building's ceilings, walls, and niches has been partially preserved to this day.

During his first reign (1815–1839), Miloš only occasionally visited the palace. Later, the building housed the Museum of Prince Miloš and Mihailo Obrenović, a hunting and forestry museum, founded in 1929.

Museum

In 1954, the 150th anniversary of the First Serbian Uprising, the former residence was opened as the Museum of the First Serbian Uprising. The museum, dedicated to the entire period of Serbian resistance to Ottoman rule known as the Serbian Revolution, later served as the basis for the Historical Museum of Serbia, founded in 1963. The Residence of Prince Miloš was declared a Monument of Culture of Exceptional Importance in 1979, placing it under the protection of the government of Serbia.

See also
List of Serbian monarchs
Tourism in Serbia

References

1831 establishments in Serbia
Houses completed in 1831
Cultural Monuments of Exceptional Importance (Serbia)
Palaces in Serbia
Manor houses in Serbia
Architecture in Serbia
Ottoman architecture in Serbia
Tourist attractions in Belgrade
Museums established in 1954
Museums in Belgrade
History museums in Serbia
Savski Venac